Expedition Robinson 2001, was the fifth edition of Expedition Robinson, or Survivor as it is referred to in some countries, to air in Sweden, airing in 2001. Prior to filming, the public was asked to choose two contestants,  from a pool of six, that would join the game as jokers and coaches for their respective teams.  Following the vote, both Bo Jonsson and Sara Aldrin entered the game. The major twist for this season was the tribal swap that took place after the duel in episode three.  This season also saw the first "pre-first" vote exit which was taken by Maria Kjellström. The second twist of the season was introduced when it was time for the jury to vote: each finalist was allowed to pick three of the last nine contestants eliminated to vote for a winner. The other three votes would come from the public. Ultimately, it was Jan Emanuel Johansson who won the season with a jury vote of 7–2 over Jan Dinkelspiel. All three public votes went to Jan Emanuel Johansson.

Finishing order

Lost Public Vote

Voting history

 Bo was immune at the North team's first tribal council as team coach.
 Tommy was immune at the second tribal council.
 Sara was immune at the South team's first tribal council as team coach.
 Jan was immune at the fourth tribal council.
 Björn was immune at the fifth tribal council.
 As a twist this season, the first five people voted out of the Robinson tribe would have a vote at the tribal council after their elimination.
 Both members of the final two were allowed to choose three people from the last nine eliminated as jury members.
 The public was allowed to award three votes to the finalists.

Book

References
 

 2001
Swedish reality television series
2001 Swedish television seasons
2000s reality television series